The Fantasticar is a fictional flying car appearing in American comic books published by Marvel Comics. The vehicle is depicted as the primary mode of transportation for the fictional Marvel comics superhero team, the Fantastic Four. Several versions have been created by Mister Fantastic, leader of the team.

Fantasticar Mk. I
The original Fantasticar, which debuted in Fantastic Four #3 (Mar. 1962), was an oval-like flying car that could split apart into multiple sections piloted by individual members of the Fantastic Four, a model which would be maintained in all later versions. This model, like all other models used when the Fantastic Four lived in the Baxter Building was stored in the top floor hangars. This design has often been ridiculed as looking like a "flying bathtub" by many, and it was later replaced.

Fantasticar Mk. II
This version, seen by many as the "classic" Fantasticar, debuted in Fantastic Four #12 (Mar. 1963) and is said to have been built by both Reed Richards and the Human Torch. It is 27 feet long, and can separate into four individual flying segments. It has VTOL capabilities and is powered by electric fans and jet turbines. It can go up to 550 mph, with a maximum altitude of 30,000 feet. While each individual pod was more clearly defined on this model, it had a number of improvements, including a transparent bulletproof windshield which could cover the entire pod, allowing for travel in extra-hazardous circumstances. This model also had a much better range and top speed, as it was able to traverse nearly the entire continental United States in a short period of time and has a range of over 3000 miles.

There would be other updates of the Fantasticar over the years, however most would be modifications on these first two designs.

Reception
 In 2021, CBR.com ranked the Fantasti-Car 9th in their "10 Most Important Vehicles In The Marvel Universe" list.
 In 2022, Sportskeeda included the Fantasticar in their "10 best vehicles in comic books" list.
 In 2022, CBR.com ranked the Fantasti-Car 4th in their "10 Coolest Vehicles In Marvel Comics" list.

Other versions

Old Man Logan
Fifty years after all the heroes were killed by the organized coalition of supervillains, the descendants of the Hulk are in possession of the Fantisticar, which they use to head to Logan's ranch.

Ultimate Marvel
In the Ultimate continuity, the Fantasticar was still invented by Reed Richards, and resembles a hybrid of the original Fantasticar from classic Marvel continuity and a modern sports utility vehicle. It was introduced in the tenth issue of Ultimate Fantastic Four. The name is soundly mocked by Ben and Johnny.

In other media

Television
In the 1978 Fantastic Four animated series, the original Fantasticar model was depicted, while the 1967 animated series and the 1994 animated series both featured Fantasticars which resemble the second version. The 2006 series Fantastic Four: World's Greatest Heroes features a version unique to the series and seen to be far more advanced.

Film
The Fantasticar was introduced to film in the 2007 motion picture Fantastic Four: Rise of the Silver Surfer, and appears to be a much sleeker version of the original Fantasticar. It is shown as being able to travel from New York to Siberia in a matter of minutes on autopilot, and can be summoned from Reed's palm top computer. Like its comics counterpart, it can also split into multiple sections (only three in this version, since the Human Torch can fly). In an element of product placement, the Fantasticar has the Dodge logo (presumably inspired by the Juggernaut meme) on its front end, prompting Johnny to ask if it is powered by a Hemi, to which he is told "of course".

A reference to the Fantasticar was made in the 2015 reboot film Fantastic Four, in which after a young Reed claims to have already built a teleportation device, his teacher sarcastically asks, "Is it next to your flying car?", which Reed responds, "I don't work on that anymore". The car was axed from the film's script.

See also
Fantasticopter

References

Fantastic Four
Marvel Comics vehicles